Strophitus is a genus of freshwater mussels, aquatic bivalve mollusks in the family Unionidae, the river mussels.

Species within the genus Strophitus
 Strophitus connasaugaensis
 Strophitus subvexus
 Strophitus undulatus

References 

Unionidae
Bivalve genera
Taxonomy articles created by Polbot